Darreh Dazi (also Romanized as Darreh Dazī; also known as Darrehdowzu) is a village in Haparu Rural District, in the Central District of Bagh-e Malek County, Khuzestan Province, Iran. At the 2006 census, its population was 22, in 4 families.

References 

Populated places in Bagh-e Malek County